This is a list of the Canadian electoral districts used between 1987 and 1996.  During this period, the House of Commons had 295 seats.  This arrangement was used in the 1988 and 1993 elections.

Newfoundland - 7 seats
Bonavista—Trinity—Conception
Burin—St. George's
Gander—Grand-Falls
Humber—St. Barbe—Baie Verte
Labrador
St. John's East
St. John's West

Prince Edward Island - 4 seats
Cardigan
Egmont
Hillsborough
Malpeque

Nova Scotia - 11 seats
Annapolis Valley—Hants
Cape Breton Highlands—Canso
Cape Breton—East Richmond
Cape Breton—The Sydneys
Central Nova
Cumberland—Colchester
Dartmouth
Halifax
Halifax West
South Shore
Southwest Nova

New Brunswick - 10 seats
Acadie—Bathurst (Gloucester prior to 1990)
Beausejour
Carleton—Charlotte
Fredericton—York—Sunbury (Fredericton prior to 1989)
Fundy—Royal
Madawaska—Victoria
Miramichi
Moncton
Restigouche—Chaleur (Restigouche prior to 1989)
Saint John

Quebec - 75 seats
Abitibi
Ahuntsic
Anjou—Rivière-des-Prairies
Argenteuil—Papineau
Beauce
Beauharnois—Salaberry
Beauport—Montmorency—Orléans (Montmorency—Orléans prior to 1990)
Bellechasse
Berthier—Montcalm
Blainville—Deux-Montagnes
Bonaventure—Îles-de-la-Madeleine
Bourassa
Brome—Missisquoi
Chambly
Champlain
Charlesbourg
Charlevoix
Châteauguay
Chicoutimi
Drummond
Frontenac
Gaspé
Gatineau—La Lièvre (Chapleau prior to 1988)
Hochelaga—Maisonneuve
Hull—Aylmer
Joliette
Jonquiere
Kamouraska—Rivière-du-Loup
La Prairie
Lac-Saint-Jean
Lachine—Lac-Saint-Louis
LaSalle—Émard
Laurentides
Laurier—Sainte-Marie
Laval Centre (Laval-des-Rapides prior to 1990)
Laval East (Duvernay prior to 1990)
Laval West (Laval prior to 1990)
Lévis
Longueuil
Lotbinière
Louis-Hébert
Manicouagan
Matapédia—Matane
Mégantic—Compton—Stanstead
Mercier
Mount Royal
Notre-Dame-de-Grâce
Outremont
Papineau—Saint-Michel
Pierrefonds—Dollard
Pontiac—Gatineau—Labelle
Portneuf
Québec (Langelier prior to 1990)
Quebec East
Richelieu
Richmond—Wolfe
Rimouski—Témiscouata
Roberval
Rosemont
Saint-Denis
Saint-Henri—Westmount
Saint-Hubert
Saint-Hyacinthe—Bagot
Saint-Jean
Saint-Laurent—Cartierville (Saint-Laurent prior to 1989)
Saint-Léonard
Saint-Maurice
Shefford
Sherbrooke
Témiscamingue
Terrebonne
Trois-Rivières
Vaudreuil
Verchères
Verdun—Saint-Paul

Ontario - 99 seats
Algoma—Manitoulin
Beaches—Woodbine
Bramalea—Gore—Malton (Brampton—Malton prior to 1990)
Brampton
Brant
Broadview—Greenwood
Bruce—Grey
Burlington
Cambridge
Carleton—Gloucester
Cochrane—Superior
Davenport
Don Valley East
Don Valley North
Don Valley West
Durham
Eglinton—Lawrence
Elgin—Norfolk (Elgin prior to 1990)
Erie
Essex-Kent
Essex-Windsor
Etobicoke Centre
Etobicoke North
Etobicoke—Lakeshore
Glengarry—Prescott—Russell
Guelph—Wellington
Haldimand—Norfolk
Halton—Peel
Hamilton East
Hamilton Mountain
Hamilton—Wentworth
Hamilton West
Hastings—Frontenac—Lennox and Addington
Huron—Bruce
Kenora—Rainy River
Kent
Kingston and the Islands
Kitchener
Lambton—Kent—Middlesex
Lanark—Carleton
Leeds—Grenville
Lincoln
London East
London—Middlesex
London West
Markham—Whitchurch—Stouffville (Markham prior to 1989)
Mississauga East
Mississauga South
Mississauga West
Nepean
Niagara Falls
Nickel Belt
Nipissing
Northumberland
Oakville—Milton
Ontario
Oshawa
Ottawa Centre
Ottawa South
Ottawa West
Ottawa—Vanier
Oxford
Parkdale—High Park
Parry Sound—Muskoka
Perth—Wellington—Waterloo
Peterborough
Prince Edward—Hastings
Renfrew—Nipissing—Pembroke (Renfrew prior to 1989)
Rosedale
Sarnia—Lambton
Sault Ste. Marie
Scarborough Centre
Scarborough East
Scarborough West
Scarborough—Agincourt
Scarborough—Rouge River
Simcoe Centre
Simcoe North
St. Catharines
St. Paul's
Stormont—Dundas
Sudbury
Thunder Bay—Atikokan
Thunder Bay—Nipigon
Timiskaming (renamed Timiskaming—French River in 1993; no boundary change)
Timmins—Chapleau
Trinity—Spadina
Victoria—Haliburton
Waterloo
Welland—St. Catharines—Thorold
Wellington—Grey—Dufferin—Simcoe
Willowdale
Windsor West
Windsor—St. Clair (Windsor—Lake St. Clair prior to 1989)
York Centre
York North
York South—Weston
York—Simcoe
York West

Manitoba - 14 seats
Brandon—Souris
Churchill
Dauphin—Swan River
Lisgar—Marquette
Portage—Interlake
Provencher
Selkirk—Red River (Selkirk prior to 1990)
Saint Boniface
Winnipeg North Centre
Winnipeg North
Winnipeg South
Winnipeg St. James
Winnipeg South Centre
Winnipeg—Transcona

Saskatchewan - 14 seats
Kindersley—Lloydminster
Mackenzie
Moose Jaw—Lake Centre
Prince Albert—Churchill River
Regina—Lumsden
Regina—Qu'Appelle
Regina—Wascana
Saskatoon—Clark's Crossing
Saskatoon—Dundurn
Saskatoon—Humboldt
Souris—Moose Mountain
Swift Current—Maple Creek—Assiniboia
The Battlefords—Meadow Lake
Yorkton—Melville

Alberta - 26 seats
Athabasca
Beaver River
Calgary Centre
Calgary North
Calgary Northeast
Calgary Southeast
Calgary Southwest
Calgary West
Crowfoot
Edmonton East
Edmonton North
Edmonton Northwest
Edmonton Southeast
Edmonton Southwest
Edmonton—Strathcona
Elk Island
Lethbridge
Macleod
Medicine Hat
Peace River
Red Deer
St. Albert
Vegreville
Wetaskiwin
Wild Rose
Yellowhead

British Columbia - 32 seats
Burnaby—Kingsway
Capilano—Howe Sound
Cariboo—Chilcotin
Comox—Alberni
Delta
Esquimalt—Juan de Fuca
Fraser Valley East
Fraser Valley West
Kamloops
Kootenay East
Kootenay West—Revelstoke
Mission—Coquitlam
Nanaimo—Cowichan
New Westminster—Burnaby
North Island—Powell River
North Vancouver
Okanagan Centre
Okanagan—Shuswap
Okanagan—Similkameen—Merritt
Port Moody—Coquitlam
Prince George—Bulkley Valley
Prince George—Peace River
Richmond
Saanich—Gulf Islands
Skeena
Surrey North
Surrey—White Rock—South Langley (Surrey—White Rock prior to 1990)
Vancouver Centre
Vancouver East
Vancouver Quadra
Vancouver South
Victoria

Northwest Territories - 2 seats
Western Arctic
Nunatsiaq

Yukon - 1 seat
Yukon

1987-1996